Actinominthella is a genus of flies in the family Tachinidae. It contains only one species, Actinominthella atrophopodella.

References

Further reading

External links

 

Tachinidae genera
Monotypic Brachycera genera
Taxa named by Charles Henry Tyler Townsend